"Since I Don't Have You" is a song written and composed by Jackie Taylor, James Beaumont, Janet Vogel, Joseph Rock, Joe Verscharen, Lennie Martin, and Wally Lester. It was first a 1958 hit single  for the doo-wop group the Skyliners on the Billboard Hot 100. Country music singer Ronnie Milsap had a hit with the song in 1991. American hard rock band Guns N' Roses also had some success in 1994 with their version of the song which reached the top 10 on the UK Singles Chart.

The Skyliners version

Background
Taken from their self-titled album and released in late 1958, the single reached number 12 on the Billboard Hot 100 chart and number 7 on the Cash Box Top 100. It was also a top five hit on the 1959 R&B chart.

Charts

Don McLean version

Don McLean's 1981 rendition reached number 23 on the Billboard Hot 100 and number 6 on the Adult Contemporary chart. In Canada, it peaked at number two on its AC chart.

Charts

Ronnie Milsap version

Background
Country music artist Ronnie Milsap's version was a number 6 hit on the Billboard Hot Country Singles & Tracks chart in 1991.
The single was taken from his album Back to the Grindstone, released on RCA Nashville. It was produced by Milsap, Rob Galbraith, and Richard Landis.

Charts

Guns N' Roses version

Background
The song was covered by rock band  Guns N' Roses for their fifth studio album, "The Spaghetti Incident?" (1993). This was Guns N' Roses' 18th single release overall, and the second single released from "The Spaghetti Incident?". The single was released in mid-1994, reaching No. 69 on the Hot 100 and the top ten in the UK. The music video features actor Gary Oldman – then a popular casting choice for Hollywood villains – as a smiling demon who is constantly mocking singer Axl Rose. The video was the last to feature original members Duff McKagan and Slash, as well as drummer Matt Sorum and rhythm guitarist Gilby Clarke.

Personnel
 W. Axl Roselead vocals, keyboards
 Slashlead guitar
 Duff McKaganbass
 Matt Sorumdrums
 Dizzy Reedpiano
 Gilby Clarkeacoustic guitar

Charts

Weekly charts

Year-end charts

Release history

Other notable versions 
In 1964, Chuck Jackson went to No. 47 on the Hot 100 with his recording.
Art Garfunkel reached No. 38 on the UK singles chart in July 1979 with his cover, while peaking at No. 53 on the Billboard Hot 100 and No. 5 on the adult contemporary chart in the US.

References

External links
 

1958 songs
1958 debut singles
1959 singles
1991 singles
1994 singles
The Skyliners songs
Guns N' Roses songs
Art Garfunkel songs
Don McLean songs
Ronnie Milsap songs
Music videos directed by Deaton-Flanigen Productions
Song recordings produced by Richard Landis
Number-one singles in Iceland
RCA Records Nashville singles
Geffen Records singles
Millennium Records singles
Doo-wop songs
Torch songs